Dustin Jeffrey (born February 27, 1988) is a Canadian professional ice hockey centre who is currently playing for Grizzlys Wolfsburg of the Deutsche Eishockey Liga (DEL). Jeffrey was drafted as the 171st overall selection in the sixth round of the 2007 NHL Entry Draft by the Penguins.

Playing career
Jeffrey grew up in Courtright, Ontario, playing minor hockey for the Mooretown Flags and the Lambton Jr. Sting AAA teams of the Pavilion League.

On October 9, 2007, Jeffrey signed a three-year entry-level contract with the Pittsburgh Penguins. He attended training camp with the Penguins in September 2008, and was assigned to the Wilkes-Barre/Scranton Penguins.
Jeffrey tallied his first professional point in his second professional game in the AHL with the Wilkes-Barre/Scranton Penguins on October 11, 2008 against the Philadelphia Phantoms. He scored this goal a minute into the first period on goaltender Jean-Sébastien Aubin.

Jeffrey made his NHL debut with the Penguins on December 26, 2008. He recorded his first point on December 30 and his first goal on January 1, 2009, both against goaltender Manny Fernandez of the Boston Bruins.  He was called as spare for 2009 playoffs.  Pittsburgh gave him a Stanley Cup ring, and included him on the team picture.  Jeffrey however did not qualify to be included on the Stanley Cup.

Jeffrey played with both the Pittsburgh and their AHL affiliate Wilkes-Barre multiple times during the 2010-11 NHL season. He played 25 games with the Penguins during the 2010–11 season, scoring seven goals and 12 points in 25 games. His season came to an end on March 24, 2011, when he was placed on the injured reserve due to a "lower body injury" after Philadelphia Flyers forward Jeff Carter fell on Jeffrey's right knee. It was revealed on April 5, 2011 that he had a torn ACL and had undergone surgery; he required six months' worth of rehabilitation and did not return until the start of the 2011–12 season.

On July 12, 2011 Jeffrey signed a two-year, two-way contract with the Penguins worth $575,000 annually at the NHL level. On October 10, 2012, with the NHL lock-out in effect, Jeffrey signed a temporary contract with Croatian club KHL Medveščak Zagreb of the Austrian Hockey League.

On November 17, 2013, Jeffrey was put on waivers by the Penguins and claimed by the Dallas Stars. On June 17, 2014, the Texas Stars won the Calder Cup for the first time in franchise history. Jeffrey wasn't given a qualifying offer before the Restricted Free Agent deadline, from the Stars, making him an unrestricted free agent.

On July 2, 2014, Jeffrey signed a one-year free agent contract with the Vancouver Canucks. He was traded to the New York Islanders in exchange for Cory Conacher on March 2, 2015.

On July 1, 2015, Jeffrey continued his journeyman career in signing a one-year, two-way contract as a free agent with the Arizona Coyotes. In the 2015–16 season, Jeffrey maintained his offensive prowess in the AHL with affiliate, the Springfield Falcons. He was recalled by the Coyotes on two occasions appearing in 7 games for a goal and assist. After scoring 46 points in just 45 games, Jeffrey was dealt by the Coyotes alongside Dan O'Donoghue and James Melindy in a return to the Pittsburgh Penguins organization in exchange for Matia Marcantuoni on February 29, 2016. He was directly assigned to continue the season with Wilkes-Barre/Scranton.

On June 3, 2016, Jeffrey left North America and agreed to a two-year contract with Lausanne HC of the National League (NL). On December 20, 2017, Jeffrey agreed to an early two-year contract extension with Lausanne through the 2019–20 season. On November 21, 2019, it was announced that this would be Jeffrey's final season with Lausanne as the team didn't wish to extend his contract. A few days later, on December 4, 2019, Jeffrey agreed to a two-year deal with SC Bern for the 2020/21 and 2021/22 season.

Following the conclusion of his contract with Bern, Jeffrey moved to Germany as a free agent by agreeing to a one-year contract with Grizzlys Wolfsburg of the DEL on July 18, 2022.

Career statistics

Awards and honours

References

External links

1988 births
Living people
Arizona Coyotes players
SC Bern players
Bridgeport Sound Tigers players
Canadian expatriate ice hockey players in Croatia
Canadian expatriate ice hockey players in the United States
Canadian expatriate ice hockey players in Switzerland
Canadian ice hockey centres
Dallas Stars players
Grizzlys Wolfsburg players
Ice hockey people from Ontario
KHL Medveščak Zagreb players
Lausanne HC players
Mississauga IceDogs players
Pittsburgh Penguins draft picks
Pittsburgh Penguins players
Sault Ste. Marie Greyhounds players
Sportspeople from Sarnia
Springfield Falcons players
Texas Stars players
Utica Comets players
Wilkes-Barre/Scranton Penguins players